The NCAA Division II Men's Lacrosse Championship is the annual championship in men's lacrosse held by the NCAA for teams competing in Division II.

Following the institution of a tournament for Division I in 1971 by the NCAA, the United States Intercollegiate Lacrosse Association added a "small college" tournament for two years for non-Division I schools. In 1972, Hobart defeated Washington College 15-12 to win the USILA title. And Cortland State beat Washington College to win the 1973 title, 13-8.

Beginning in 1974, a combined NCAA Division II and III tournament was played through the 1979 season, after which separate divisional championships were instituted. The Division II championship was discontinued after the 1981 season. Following a twelve-year interruption, the tournament was resumed in 1993.

During the 1982–1992 period in which no Division II championship existed, all Division II men's lacrosse programs were allowed by NCAA rules to compete as Division I members in that sport. Several D-II teams received invitations to the D-I tournament in this period, including Adelphi in 1982; C.W. Post in 1986; Adelphi again in 1987, where they upset Army; and Adelphi once more in 1989, where they received a number five seeding.

Results

Team championship records

 Schools highlighted in pink are closed or no longer sponsor athletics.
 Schools highlight in yellow have reclassified athletics from NCAA Division II.

Finals appearances by state

See also
NCAA Division II Women's Lacrosse Championship
NCAA Division I Men's Lacrosse Championship
NCAA Division III Men's Lacrosse Championship
United States Intercollegiate Lacrosse Association
Wingate Memorial Trophy
North–South Senior All-Star Game
Pre-NCAA Lacrosse Champion

References

External links
Division II men's lacrosse